Phytelepheae is a tribe of plants in the subfamily Ceroxyloideae of the family Arecaceae.

Genera
Three genera are included in Phytelepeae:
Ammandra
Aphandra
Phytelephas

References

Ceroxyloideae
Monocot tribes